Baaraan Ijlal is an Indian artist. She was born and grew up in Bhopal, India.

Ijlal attended the Saifia College and received Master of Arts in English Literature in 1999. Her brother, Moonis Ijlal, is also an artist.

Works
 Silent Minarets Whispering Winds (2015–16)
 Change Room (2018)
 Hostile Witness
 Sound Room
 Birdbox
 Stitched Wings
 To Be Continued

References

Year of birth missing (living people)
Living people
21st-century Indian painters
Artists from Bhopal